Acetylene is a 2005 album by American rock band The Walkabouts. It features themes of anger and chaos.

Track listing
All songs by Chris Eckman.

 "Fuck Your Fear" – 4:15
 "Coming up for Air" – 4:06
 "Devil in the Details" – 4:24
 "Whisper" – 5:55
 "Kalashnikov" – 5:31
 "Have You Ever Seen the Morning?" – 3:56
 "Northsea Train" – 5:43
 "Acetylene" – 3:36
 "Before This City Wakes" – 6:02
 "The Last Ones" – 9:09

Musicians
 Terri Moeller – drums
 Michael Wells – bass guitar
 Glenn Slater – Minimoog synthesizer, organ, mellotron
 Chris Eckman – vocals, electric guitar
 Carla Torgerson – vocals, electric guitar
 Al DeLoner (of Midnight Choir) – occasionally lead electric guitar, piano, e-bow

References

2005 albums